2 Architect Rossi Street is a building in St. Petersburg, Russia. It is located at the corner of Ostrovsky Square and Architect Rossi Street (also called just Rossi Street), which is named for the Italian architect Carlo Rossi who spent his working life in Russia.

Description
The building, a prime architectural ornament of the city, follows the canons of classical antiquity: its height and width are identical, and its length is exactly ten times its width. It is located in central St. Petersburg, the nearest metro station being Gostiny Dvor.

History
In the middle of the 18th century the site was occupied with gardens and outbuildings of the Vorontsov Palace and the Anichkov Palace.

At the end of the 18th century the plot was sold and design work for the site was begun in 1816 by the Committee for Structures and Hydraulic Works. All five buildings on Rossi Street were designed by Carlo Rossi and built between 1828 and 1834. #2 was built in 1832. Since then the facade has remained essentially unchanged.

The building was initially a commercial enterprise under the aegis of the Ministry of the Imperial Court. The shops of the merchants Dejtera, Kolpakov, and Nizovskaya, and porcelain, glass, and paper manufactories were located on the ground floor. The upper two floors held apartments.

The merchants of the nearby Gostiny Dvor shopping arcade petitioned the Czar (Nicholas I) for protection from this competition, and in 1836 he ordered 2 Rossi Street transferred to the Directorate of Imperial Theaters.

After some changes to the facade and interior (arches converted to window niches, interior walls removed to create open halls) under the direction of the architect Alberto Cavos, the Imperial Ballet School (now the Vaganova Academy of Russian Ballet) took over the building. 2 Rossi Street became the center of theatrical life in St. Petersburg and many outstanding masters of the theater and ballet trained at the academy.

In 1890-1891 a building was constructed in the courtyard of 2 Rossi Street (designed by Alexander Geshvend) for storing scenery for the ballet troupe of the Imperial Directorate of Theaters.

During World War II, from 1941 to 1945 the building housed the headquarters of the Leningrad Military District, and a concrete bunker was added to the building.

In 1999 the Committee on Urban Planning & Architecture held a design competition for the improvement of Architect Rossi Street and Ostrovsky Square, and various improvements were made to the street, adding granite pavements and stone ramps.

At the end of 2007 an overhaul of the building was announced, including the addition of penthouse apartments. Renovation began in August 2009 and was scheduled to have been completed by December 2010.

Memorials
The building features memorials to some of the artists associated with 2 Rossi Street.

Ulanova monument
The monument to Galina Ulanova, created by the sculptor Elena Janson-Manizer in 1936, has a rich history.

It was first placed on Yelagin Island in Kirov Park. It remained there until the middle 1980s, by which time it had deteriorated considerably, at which time it was dismantled and placed in storage at the  Yelagin Palace.

During preparation for the celebrations of the 300th anniversary of Saint Petersburg, employees of the Vaganova Ballet Academy were alerted to the existence of the sculpture in the museum's storerooms. Under the initiative of the Rector of the Academy L. N. Nadirov, the academy accepted responsibility for the sculpture and restored it at its own expense.

The sculpture was installed in the courtyard and unveiled on January 8, 2004, the 94th anniversary of the great ballerina's birth.

Memorial plaques

References

External links
 

Commercial buildings completed in 1832
Buildings and structures in Saint Petersburg
Carlo Rossi buildings and structures
Cultural heritage monuments of federal significance in Saint Petersburg